Shahjalal University of Science and Technology (SUST) is a public research based university in Sylhet, Bangladesh. It is the 8th oldest university of the country and the first university to adopt American credit system. The university is known for its pioneering research and education in the physical sciences and engineering. In 2016, SUST ranked as the top research university in Bangladesh (610th in the world) by Scopus-SCImago institution ranking. In 2017, the university had highest research expenditure among all universities in Bangladesh. Following the success of SUST, twelve more STEM universities have been established in the country by the Government of Bangladesh.

History

Shahjalal University of Science and Technology was established in 1986. The campus is located in Kumargaon, approximately six kilometers away from the heart of Sylhet City Centre. The university started its academic program with three departments: physics, chemistry, and economics. Renowned scientist and educator Sadruddin Ahmed Chowdhury was the first Vice-chancellor of the university. The first convocation of SUST was held on 29 April 1998 and the second convocation held on 6 December 2007 where the third convocation was held on 8 January 2020. At present, SUST has 7,662 students, 487 academic staffs and 772 administrative staffs; i.e. the university has 6.09 students per staff.

SUST is the first university in Bangladesh providing whole campus free Wi-Fi access for students and staff. The university introduced an integrated honors course for the first time in Bangladesh and it introduced the semester system (American credit system) from the 1996-97 session. In 2019, Executive Committee of the National Economic Council (ECNEC) allocated BDT 9.88 billion (US$117 million) fund for 20 development projects of SUST.

The students of SUST invented and introduced the paperless 24/7 SMS Based Automated Registration of Admission Test procedure for the first time in Bangladesh. Interested students can complete the registration process through mobile phone messages. The contemporary government launched the system on 13 September 2009. For the invention, the university won an Ambillion Award in a competition of South Asian countries in 2010 and National Award for E-Content and ICT for Development Award 2010. Now, most of the public universities in Bangladesh have adopted this process of registration.

Academics

Admission
SUST enrolls undergraduate, graduate and postgraduate students. All applicants need to pass the admission test arranged by the specific schools under the authority of admission council, which is highly competitive. In 2018-19 session, SUST received 76,068 undergraduate applications only admitting 1,448; an acceptance rate of 1.90%. A total of 71,018 students vied for 1,703 seats at the university for the session 2019–2020.

Ranking and reputation

SUST gives high priority on research. In 2017, the university spent  in research; the highest research expenditure among all universities in Bangladesh, almost double of the 2nd one.

In 2016, SUST ranked as the top research university in Bangladesh (610th in the world) by Scopus-SCImago institution ranking. In 2019, it ranked 337th in Asia and 610th in the world among 3,471 higher educational institutions. SUST ranked at 445th for research and 493rd for innovation in the world. It ranked 1st in 2015 and 3rd in 2021 among all universities in Bangladesh by Webometrics.

In 2018, the team from SUST became the world champion of NASA Space Apps Challenge among 1,395 local winning teams from around the world. In the International Theoretical Physics Olympiad 2019, seven teams from SUST got place among finalist 88 and achieved 15th spot in the world (highest individual achievement of an Asian University). Due to pioneering contributions in science and technology, the university is often referred as Stanford of the east.

Conference

The biggest yearly conference of SUST is International Conference on Engineering Research, Innovation and Education (ICERIE). In ICERIE, several hundred universities attend from different parts of the world and present research papers in the various fields of applied sciences, architecture, and engineering.

Other significant conferences of SUST:
 International Conference on Social Work and Sustainable Social Development (ICSCWSSD)
 International Conference on Materials Chemistry (ICMC)
 International Conference on Advance in Physics (ICAP)
 International Conference on Environmental Technology and Construction Engineering for Sustainable Development (ICETCESD)

In 2019, SUST organized the first-ever International Convention of Vice-Chancellors (ICVC) in Bangladesh. In 1999, SUST hosted the 3rd International Conference on Computer and Information Technology. In addition to these, the academic departments host numerous conferences on respective fields regularly.

Collaboration
SUST has academic and research collaboration with following institutes:

  International Development Association
  Global Water Partnership
  International Union for Conservation of Nature
  American Institute of Bangladesh Studies
  Indiana University
  Karlsruhe Institute of Technology

Carnival
Since 2011, SUST has arranged an annual three-day CSE Carnival. The carnival features a programming contest, software developing competition, and related events. In 2015, it involved 1,000 students in 145 teams from 46 universities.

Schools and departments
SUST is the first public university to introduce undergraduate programs in Software Engineering in Bangladesh. It is the second oldest in the country to introduce engineering education in the fields of Chemical, Computer Science, Industrial & Production, Petroleum & Mining. Also, the third oldest to introduce Architecture, Food Engineering & Tea Technology, Genetic engineering & Biotechnology programs in the country. In total, SUST has 27 departments under seven schools:

School of Agriculture and Mineral Sciences
 Department of Forestry & Environmental Science (FES)

School of Applied Sciences and Technology
 Department of Architecture (ARC)
 Department of Chemical Engineering & Polymer Science (CEP)
 Department of Civil & Environmental Engineering (CEE)
 Department of Computer Science & Engineering (CSE)
 Department of Electrical & Electronic Engineering (EEE)
 Department of Food Engineering & Tea Technology (FET)
 Department of Industrial & Production Engineering (IPE)
 Department of Mechanical Engineering (MEE)
 Department of Petroleum & Mining Engineering (PME)

School of Life Sciences
 Department of Biochemistry and Molecular Biology (BMB)
 Department of Genetic Engineering and Biotechnology (GEB-SUST)

School of Management and Business Administration
 Department of Business Administration

School of Medical Sciences
6 affiliated medical colleges:
 M A G Osmani Medical College, Sylhet
 Sheikh Hasina Medical College, Habiganj
 Jalalabad Ragib-Rabeya Medical College
 North East Medical College
 Sylhet Women's Medical College
 Park View Medical College

School of Physical Sciences
 Department of Chemistry (CHE)
 Department of Geography and Environment (GEE)
 Department of Mathematics (MAT)
 Department of Physics (PHY)
 Department of Statistics (STA)
 Department of Oceanography (OCG)

School of Social Sciences
 Department of Anthropology (ANP)
 Department of Bangla (BNG)
 Department of Economics (ECO)
 Department of English (ENG)
 Department of Political Studies (PSS)
 Department of Public Administration (PAD)
 Department of Social work (SCW)
 Department of Sociology (SOC)

Second Major Program
SUST is the first and only university in Bangladesh to initiate the "Second Major Program" under department of Computer Science & Engineering, where a student can enroll in another department as the second major besides his/her first major. Currently, only three departments: EEE, Physics, Mathematics offer a second major degree as department of Computer Science & Engineering has stopped taking new students. A student studying in this university has to sit for an aptitude test after his/her first year of study to be considered for the program as there are only a limited number of students who can enroll in this program. Any students from the School of Applied Sciences & Technology, the School of Life Sciences, the School of Physical Sciences, the School of Agricultural & Mineral Sciences can sit for the test, and they can so only after their first year of study in the university. A "Second Major" degree is awarded on completion of 36 credits of core courses from the respective department.

Affiliated colleges
 Al-Amin Dental College
 Begum Rabeya Khatun Chowdhury Nursing College
 North East Nursing College
 Sylhet Engineering College
 Sylhet Nursing College

Affiliated School
There is a school which is in under SUST:
 Shahjalal University School

Institutes
There are two institutions of SUST

 Institute of Information and Communication Technology (IICT)
 Institute of Modern Languages (IML)

, IML offers academic programs in Arabic, English, French, German, and Japanese.

CRTC Architecture

SUST Department of Architecture is the 3rd oldest public architecture school in Bangladesh. The Center for Research, Testing, and Consultancy (CRTC Architecture) focus on research areas such as building planning and design, interior design, landscape development, urban planning, and urban renewal, conservation of historical sites and monuments, the architecture of Bengal region, sustainable design, low-cost housing, etc. according to the regional context. The center has been widely working with the traditional house forms, settlement patterns, urban growth, and architectural development of the region.

CRTC CSE

The CRTC program, Department of Computer Science & Engineering focuses on research areas such as Optical Character Recognition, Parallel Processing, Cluster Computer, CodeWitz, Asia Link Project, Cellular Phone & Computer Interfacing, Bangla Computerization, Natural Language Processing etc. The software house offers professional working environment to the students.

CRTC CEE
Civil and Environmental Engineering (CEE) department established the center for research, testing, and consultancy (CRTC) to provide research, testing, and consultancy services in 2003. CRTC designed a water treatment plant to remove a high concentration of iron (>11  mg/lit) in groundwater of the Sylhet region; such a plant has been successfully operating in Hotels in Sylhet city. CTRC already planned and designed the structural and drainage systems of the Madina Garden City near Sylhet International Airport, including EIA, and recently has been working for Gazi Burhan Uddin Model City near Sylhet upashahar. CRTC has been performing all kinds of testing in the field of water, wastewater, cement, concrete, rod beam, soil, air, noise, etc. since 2003.

CRTC Physics
The CRTC program, Department of Physics has numbers of research groups have research activities in areas of Theoretical and Experimental Nuclear Physics, Nonlinear Optics, Thin-film Magnetism, Neutron Scattering, Neutron Activation Analysis, Neutron Radiography, Defects in Solids, Semiconductor Physics, Condensed Matter Physics, Gravitational Physics and Celestial Mechanics and Theoretical Physics. In 2015, CRTC Physics invented low cost technology to detect cancer.

Campus

Campus life

SUST has an urban campus area of 320 acres. Many visitors come to Sylhet to visit the "Shahid Minar" (Martyr's Memorial) of the university. The memorial stands on the top of a small hill and is surrounded by trees. Different cultural organizations arrange programs on the premises on local and national occasions. The Kilo Road is an entrance to the SUST campus known for green vista. The first-ever Bangladesh Mathematical Olympiad was held in Shahjalal University of Science and Technology in 2004.

Classes
SUST has an extensive core curriculum required of all undergraduates. SUST is the first university in Bangladesh to adopt American course credit systems for all departments. The syllabus is always updated frequently to maintain the global standard of education.

Library

SUST has a common Central Library with a collection of 180,000 volumes and 300 current periodical subscriptions for all academic departments. The library includes electronic copies of books, which can be accessed from any academic department through electronic local area networking (LAN). Per year around 2000 volumes are added to this library. The library building of SUST is known for its triangular shape. It also has a free internet browsing facility and rental library program. Additionally, there is also a departmental library in each academic department and hall library in each residential halls. The library has an Online Public Access Catalog (OPAC).

International students
SUST also welcomes foreign students. There is a significant number of international students, especially from Nepal. There are also some students in its affiliated medical college from India controlled Kashmir . Every year SUST receives applications from abroad. Most international students come from Nepal, India, Pakistan, Saudi Arabia, Sri Lanka, Maldives, Bhutan, Japan, Afghanistan, Thailand, Malaysia, Palestine, China, Finland, and Myanmar.

Halls of residence

Currently, there are five halls of residence. A significant number of students reside privately near the university area of Sylhet metro.
 Shah Paran Hall
 Bangabandhu Sheikh Mujibur Rahman Hall
 Syed Mujtaba Ali Hall
 Shahid Jononi Jahanara Imam Hall
 Begum Sirajunnesa Chowdhury Hall

There are also well-decorated houses for the faculty members of SUST.
University authorities also run some private halls of residence outside the main campus, especially for female students to guarantee the house for female students.
These halls are:
 Darul Aman Chatrabas
 Amir Complex
 Fazal Complex
 Samad House
 Maa Manjil
 Sunu Mia Complex

Sports
The students of this university participate in sports for recreation, and the finest athletes regularly compete in inter-university games like football, handball, volleyball, basketball, etc. SUST has some varsity teams. There is a Cricket ground, a Football ground, a Basketball ground, and a well-equipped gymnasium adjacent to the university student health center. SUST is the only university to have Professional Cricket League and Professional Football League. Students organize both inter-department and inter-university tournaments every year. Girls and teachers also participate in several games.

BNCC
SUST has two Bangladesh National Cadet Corps platoons, one for male and another one for female. Both the platoons train students as cadets. Cadets can enroll a course on Military Science as auxiliary subject.

University School
SUST has a university school of secondary level inside the campus for the children of staff. The school also receives general students.

Cultural organizations 
The following cultural organizations are present in the university:
 Tourist Club SUST (established in 1995)
 Chokh Film Society (CFS) (established in 1996)
 Shahjalal University Photographers Association (SUPA)
 Rokon Ifthekhar Memorial(RIM) (established in 1997)
 Theater SUST (established in 1997)
 Dik Theater (established in 1999)
 Maavoi Abrittee Samsod (established in 1998)
 KIN, A voluntary Organization (established in 2003)
 NONGAR (established in 2003)
 SUST Science Arena (established in 2004)
 Sports SUST (established in 2005)
 Cartoon Factory (established in 2007)
 Swapnotthan-A Voluntary Organization(established in 2007)
 Aaj Muktomoncho (established in 2008)
 Green Explore Society (GES) (established in 2012)
 SUST CAREER CLUB (SUSTCC)
 SUST School of debate, SUST-SD
 Shahjalal University Press Club
 Shahjalal University Debating Society (SUDS)
 Sonchalon
 SUST Shahitya Shamsad
 Student Aid SUST
 Ongikar Sanskritik Samsad

Photos of SUST

List of vice chancellors
 Sadruddin Ahmed Chowdhury (1 June 1989 to 31 May 1993)
 Syed Mohib Uddin Ahmed (26 June 1993 to 25 June 1997)
 M Habibur Rahman (20 July 1997 to 19 July 2001)
 Md Saleh Uddin (20 July 2001 to 25 December 2001)
 M Shafiqur Rahman (3 March 2002 to 27 April 2003)
 Musleh Uddin Ahmed (Incharge till 2 October 2004, 28 April 2003 to 22 October 2006)
 M Aminul Islam (23 October 2006 to 24 February 2009)
 Md Saleh Uddin (26 February 2009 to 25 February 2013)
 Md Elias Uddin Biswas (Add Incharge, 20 March 2013 to 27 July 2013)
 Md Aminul Haque Bhuyan (28 July 2013 to 27 July 2017)
 Farid Uddin Ahmed (18 August 2017– Incumbent)

Awards
 National ICT Award, (2017)

Controversy

Suing student for Facebook post
SUST sued one of its students for an alleged derogatory Facebook post about a dead politician of the ruling party of Bangladesh. On 13 June 2020, a final year student of the economics department posted a Facebook status after Bangladesh Awami League leader Mohammed Nasim. After that, SUST Registrar Mohd Ishfaqul Hussain filed a case with Jalalabad Police Station On behalf of the university. The case was filed under sections 25 and 29 of the Digital Security Act. When asked about how the university can sue a student for something personal and did not violate the proctorial rules, the VC Farid Uddin Ahmed explained to Daily Star's journalist that the student had ruined the university's image.

Notable people
 Sadruddin Ahmed Chowdhury, scientist and founder Vice-Chancellor of SUST
 Arun Kumar Basak, founder professor, Department of Physics, professor emeritus of physics ar University of Rajshahi
 Muhammad Zafar Iqbal, retired professor, Department of Computer Science & Engineering, and writer.
 Nasima Akhter, Alumni; Honoured with the Elsevier Foundation Award for her work on nuclear medicine and ultrasonography

See also
 List of universities in Bangladesh
 Bangladesh University of Engineering and Technology (BUET)
 Bangladesh University of Textiles (BUTEX)

Notes and references

Further reading

External links

 Official website

 
Veterinary schools in Bangladesh
Public universities of Bangladesh
Architecture schools in Bangladesh
Engineering universities of Bangladesh
Technological institutes of Bangladesh
Business schools in Bangladesh
Universities of science and technology in Bangladesh
1986 establishments in Bangladesh
Universities and colleges in Sylhet District